Larvotto is a private housing estate in Hong Kong. It was developed by Sun Hung Kai Properties, Kerry Properties and Paliburg Holdings, built and sold by Sun Hung Kai and managed by Kerry Properties. The site comprises 180,000 square feet, including nine buildings and a total of 715 tenements. It is located in 8 Ap Lei Chau Praya Road, Ap Lei Chau, Hong Kong. The estate is opposite Sham Wan. It got the occupation permit at the end of April 2011.

Introduction 
Larvotto is located in East Ap Lei Chau, Southern District, next to the Aberdeen Channel. Close to The Aberdeen Marina Club and Ocean Park. Tower 1 and 2 overlooks Repulse Bay, Stanley, and other scenery. The estate is close to Marinella, Sham Wan Towers, South Horizons, Bel-Air and other well-known estates.

Before the project was officially named, it was known as Seaview Leighton Hill, because this is another project cooperated by Sun Hung Kai Properties, Kerry Properties and Paliburg Holdings after Leighton Hill. The English naming ideas of "Larvotto" comes from the famous La Futuo Beach (Larvotto Beach) in western Europe Monte Carlo. The naming ideas of the Chinese name "南灣" comes from the nearby South Bay Beach on Hong Kong Island. South Bay is also one of the richest residential areas in Hong Kong.

Residential flats start at 7/F, every flat has a terrace and high ceilings of about 3.3 to 3.5 m. Some of the special units have a private swimming pool and a roof.

Larvotto has 9 towers (without tower 4), and is divided into three parts.
Tower 1,2: Each floor 2 flats, 2,363 to 2,545 square feet.
Tower 3,5,6,7: Each floor 3 flats, 990 to 1,998 square feet.
Tower 8,9,10: Each floor 4 flats, 591 to 1,338 square feet.

Its 150,000 square feet club house is named Club Voyage. In addition to the basic facilities and ample space for leisure, it also includes private yacht services, training coach services, indoor and outdoor swimming pool, multipurpose playground, karaoke, entertainment rooms, spa rooms, an advanced sea view restaurant, two ballrooms and three gardens. Larvotto also has a pet park for households that have pets. A kindergarten is operated by Braemar Hill Nursery School.

Standard Flat

Design
Being one of the landmarks in that region, Larvotto has a 320-meter sleek yacht-shaped design. Its unique design was awarded the International Real Estate Award, The best building of Hong Kong (Skyscraper) and Highly commended award, which was organized by International Real Estate Organization, Bloomberg and Google.

Sales and leasing
Larvotto was sold by Sun Hung Kai, with 94% units pre-sold in 2010. Larvoto won the 'championship' of Hong Kong real estate selling in 2010 by successfully selling about 674 units, with total price of about 14.47 billion dollars. 300 unit was sold in 8 days, breaking the sales record of the Hong Kong luxury residential. Average price of the transactions is 30 million dollars. The prices of parking spaces range from 1450000 to 1580000, hitting a new high in the same district.

Neighboring landmarks
Ocean Park
Jumbo Floating Restaurant
Aberdeen Boat Club
The Aberdeen Marina Club
Ap Lei Chau Wind Tower Park

Transportation
Shuttle bus HR87 (Larvotto/Central Harbour Building)
MTR Lei Tung station
Main roads: Ap Lei Chau Bridge, Aberdeen Praya Road, Wong Chuk Hang Road

Politics
Larvotto is located in Lei Tung I constituency of the Southern District Council. It was formerly represented by Janice Chan Yan-yi, who was elected in the 2019 elections until July 2021.

References

Oriental Daily
Hong Kong Daily News
Wenweipo
SHKP

Residential buildings in Hong Kong